This is a list of rivers of Peru, that are at least partially in Peru. The Peruvian government has published guidelines for the preparation of river flow studies in April 2015.

Longest rivers
The lengths of the following 10 rivers are according to a 2005 statistical publication by the Instituto Nacional de Estadística e Informática listing the 44 most important rivers of Peru.

By Drainage Basin
This list is arranged by drainage basin, with respective tributaries indented under each larger stream's name. Rivers longer than 400 kilometers are in bold font.

Atlantic Ocean
Amazon River
Madeira River (Brazil)
Madre de Dios River
Orthon River (Bolivia)
Tahuamanu River
Muymano River
Mamuripi River
Manuripe River
Heath River
Tambopata River, 402 km
Río de Las Piedras or Tacuatimanu, 621 km
Pariamanu River
Inambari River, 437 km
Manú River
Purús River, 483 km
Acre River
Iaco River or Yaco
Chandless River
Curanja River
Alto Purús River
Juruá River or Yurua
Alto Yurua
Putumayu
Yaguas River
Algodón River
Campuya River
San Miguel River
Yavarí River
Yavarí Mirim River
Gálvez River
Atacuarí River
Pichana River
Apayacu River
Napo River
Mazán River
Tampuyaku River
Curaray River, 414 km
Aguarico River
Nanay River
Pintuyaku River
Chambira River
Marañón River
Tigre River, 598 km
Corrientes River, 483 km
Tangarana River
Samiria River
Chambira River
Urituyaku River
Huallaga River
Paranapura River
Shanusi River
Chipurana River
Mayo River
Biabo River or Biavo
Sisa River
Wallapampa River
Abiseo River
Mishollo River
Chuntayaq River
Tulumayu River
Monzón River
Higueras River
Nucuray River
Pastaza River
Huasaga River
Morona River, 402 km
Santiago River
Nieva River
Cenepa River
Comaina River
Chiriaco River or Imaza
Chinchipe River
Utcubamba River
Quebrada Magunchal
Quebrada Seca
Chamaya River
Wayllapampaa River
Chotano River
Quebrada San Antonio
Llaucano River
Crisnejas River or Crisnegas
Cajamarca River
Condebamba River
Chusgon River
San Miguel River
Puccha River
Nupe River
Lauricocha River
Ucayali River
Tapiche River, 448 km
Guanache River
Cushabatay River
Pisqui River
Aguaytía River
Tamaya River
Pachitea River
Pichis River
Palcazu River
Pozuzo River
Huancabamba River or Huayabamba
Sheshea River or Chesheya or Chessea
Cohengu River
Urubamba River
Inuya River
Mishagua River
Camisea River
Yavero River or Paucartambo
Ticumpinia River
Cumpirusiato River
Cushireni River
Vilcanota River
Tambo River
Perené River
Pangoa River
Mazamari River
Satipo River
Paucartambo River
Chanchamayu
Tulumayu
Ene River
Mantaro River
Huarpa River
Yucay River or Pongor
Ichu River or Huancavelica
Occoro River
Willka River
Cunas River
Apurímac River
Pampas River
Pachachaka River
Santo Tomás River
Velille River

Altiplano
Desaguadero River
Mauri River
Lake Titicaca
Ilave River
Huenque River
Coata River
Ramis River
Azángaro River
Carabaya River
Ayaviri River
Huancané River
Suches River

Pacific Ocean
Zarumilla River
Tumbes River
Chira River
Piura River
Bigote River
Charanal River
Cascajal River
Olmos River
Motupe River 
La Leche River
Chancay River (Lambayeque)
Zaña River
Chamán River
Jequetepeque River
Chicama River
Moche River
Virú River
Chao River
Santa River
Lacramarca River
Nepeña River
Casma River
Sechín River
Grande River
Culebras River
Huarmey River
Fortaleza River
Pativilca River
Supe River
Huaura River
Chancay River (Huaral)
Chillón River
Rímac River
Lurín River
Mala River
Omas River
Cañete River
Topara River
San Juan River
Pisco River
Ica River
Grande River or Nazca
Acarí River
Yauca River
Indio Muerto or Chala
Chaparra
Atico
Caravelí River
Ocoña River
Camaná River
Colca River
Vitor River
Sihuas River
Quilca River or Chili
Tambo River
Corlaque River
Osmore River or Moquegua or Ilo
Asana River
Locumba River
Sama River
Caplina River

Alphabetical list

Acre River
Aguarico River
Amazon River
Apurímac River
Bigote River
Camaná River
Caplina River
Cañete River
Chamán River
Chancay River (Lambayeque)
Chancay River (Huaral)
Charanal River
Chao River
Casma River
Cenepa River
Chambira River
Chillón River
Chinchipe River
Chira River
Colca River
Comaina River
Cunas River
Desaguadero River
Ene River
Fortaleza River
Heath River
Huallaga River
Huancabamba River
Huarmey River
Ilave River
Javary River
Juruá River
Ica River
Ilo River
Jequetepeque River
La Leche River
Madre de Dios River
Mala River
Mantaro River
Manú River
Marañón River
Mayo River
Moche River
Moquegua River
Motupe River
Napo River
Nieva River
Osmore River
Palcazu River
Perené River
Pisco River
Piura River
Pozuzo River
Putumayo River
Purús River
Quebrada Magunchal
Quebrada Seca
Quilca River
Rímac River
Pachitea River
Perené River
San Antonio River
Santa River
Sechín River
Tambo River
Tambopata River
Tigre River
Tumbes River
Ucayali River
Urubamba River
Utcubamba River
Virú River
Yavarí River
Zarumilla River

See also
 Geography of Peru

References

Rand McNally, The New International Atlas, 1993.
, GEOnet Names Server

External links
 National Authority of Water
Servicio Nacional de Meteorología e Hidrología del Perú National Institute of Meteorology and Hydrology
Instituto del Mar del Perú, Maritime Institute of Peru

Peru
Rivers